Micronycteris giovanniae is a species of leaf-nosed bat found in Ecuador.

Taxonomy and etymology
It was described as a new species in 2007. The holotype had been collected in 2001. This holotype represents the only individual documented of this species as of 2016. The eponym for the species name "giovanniae" is American poet Nikki Giovanni, "in recognition of her poetry and writings." Based on analysis of the cytochrome b gene, its closest relative is the Matses' big-eared bat, M. matses.

Description
It is a medium-sized member of the genus Micronycteris. Unlike some species of the genus, its belly fur is dark. It is a diploid organism with a karyotype of 2n = 40 and a fundamental number (FN) of 68.

Location and habitat
The single individual known from this species was documented in Esmeraldas Province of Ecuador. It was found within a secondary forest that was in the process of being deforested.

References

Bats of South America
Endemic fauna of Ecuador
Mammals of Ecuador
Mammals described in 2007
Micronycteris